Bernard Kręczyński (born 28 April 1953) is a former Polish cyclist. He competed in the team pursuit event at the 1972 Summer Olympics.

References

External links
 

1953 births
Living people
Polish male cyclists
Olympic cyclists of Poland
Cyclists at the 1972 Summer Olympics
People from Stargard
Sportspeople from West Pomeranian Voivodeship